Tana bru is the administrative centre of Deatnu-Tana Municipality in Troms og Finnmark county, Norway.  The village lies on the western bank of the Tana River, along the European route E6 highway.

The village is named "Tana bru" which means "Tana Bridge" in Norwegian, and the actual Tana Bridge (on the E6 highway) crosses the river at this village, connecting Tana bru to the village of Skiippagurra on the other side of the river.

References

Villages in Finnmark
Populated places of Arctic Norway
Tana, Norway